The 2022–23 Kansas State Wildcats women's basketball team represents Kansas State University in the 2022–23 NCAA Division I women's basketball season. The Wildcats are led by ninth-year head coach Jeff Mittie. They play their home games at Bramlage Coliseum in Manhattan, Kansas and are members of the Big 12 Conference.

Previous season
They finished the season 20–13, 9–9 in Big 12 play and finished sixth in the conference. As the sixth seed in the Big 12 Tournament, they were defeated by the third seed Texas in the Quarterfinals. The Wildcats earned an at-large big to the NCAA Tournament in the Bridgeport Regional as a nine seed with a matchup against eight seed Washington State. The Wildcats beat the Cougars 50–40. Next up, the Wildcats second round matchup was against number one seed NC State and were defeated by the Wolfpack 57–89.

Roster

Schedule and results 
Source:

|-
!colspan=6 style=""| Exhibition

|-
!colspan=6 style=""| Non-conference regular season

|-
!colspan=6 style=""| Big 12 regular season

|-
!colspan=6 style=""| Big 12 tournament

|-
!colspan=6 style=""| WNIT

Rankings

See also 
 2022–23 Kansas State Wildcats men's basketball team

References 

Kansas State Wildcats women's basketball seasons
Kansas State
2022 in sports in Kansas
2023 in sports in Kansas
Kansas State